Bulverton is a small hamlet on the outskirts of Sidmouth, Devon, England.

Area Information

Bulverton comprises low-density residential housing, areas of farmland and a wooded plantation and is connected by road to Sidmouth by the B3176.

During the Sidmouth Folk Week the area is the location of the Bulverton Late Night Extra.

Since 1963 much of the Bulverton area has fallen under the East Devon Area of Outstanding Natural Beauty:

History
At the time of William the Conqueror, the hamlet formed part of the extensive Otterton Manor lands, owned by the monastery of Mont Saint-Michel in Normandy. The Otterton Cartulary, which listed ecclesiastical holdings in the medieval period, records 'Eduart de Boluorton' and Ricard de Boluorton' ploughing ferlings for the Prior.  In 1415 Bulverton and other land and possessions of the Otterton Manor passed to the Abbey of Sion in Middlesex. By the reign of Edward IV, Bulverton is listed within the Manor of Sidmouth, but the tenants still owed fealty to the Abbess of Sion. The Manor Court Roll of 1467 recorded that William Goule of Bolferton fell foul of the local assize when he was caught brewing inferior ale by the ale-taster and duly fined. After the Dissolution of the Monasteries, the Manor of Sidmouth, including the farms at Bulverton, passed into private ownership. In the late 18th Century, the Manor of Sidmouth was acquired by Thomas Jenkins, and successive owners expanded the estate. At Bulverton, generations of the same families continued to farm the land as tenants - the Gigg family at Bulverton Farm (now Bulverton House) while the Coles family occupied Bulverton Well Farm. In the early 1950's the two farms, together with other historic cottages in the hamlet, were put up for sale when the Manor estate was dispersed.

The view from Bulverton Hill is thought to have inspired 19th century poet and hymn writer John Keble who was a frequent visitor to Sidmouth. Keble's Seat at Bulverton Hill is named after him and commands a panoramic view of the Lower Otter Valley and Dartmoor in the distance.

Railway
The former Sidmouth Railway station is nearby, with the embankment still visible in certain areas. A proposed cycle route involving Sustrans may use part of the embankment in the future to link outlying towns and villages to Sidmouth.

Climate

The Met Office have a climate station at Sidmouth in the generality of Bulverton that records the comparatively mild United Kingdom climate.

Gallery

References

External links

Sidmouth Folk Week

Hamlets in Devon
East Devon District
Jurassic Coast